Ortetamine (INN), also known as 2-methylamphetamine, is a stimulant drug of the amphetamine class. In animal drug discrimination tests it substituted for dextroamphetamine more closely than either 3- or 4-methylamphetamine, although with only around 1/10 the potency of dextroamphetamine itself.

Legal status 
Sweden's public health agency classified 2-MA as a narcotic substance, on January 18, 2019. Ortetamine is an isomer of Methamphetamine, therefore, a Schedule II Controlled Substance in the United States.

See also 
 2-Fluoroamphetamine
 2-Methylmethcathinone
 2-Me-PVP
 3-Methylamphetamine
 4-Methylamphetamine
 2-Methoxymethamphetamine

References 

Designer drugs
Substituted amphetamines
Norepinephrine-dopamine releasing agents